Rachel Montes is the former mayor of El Monte, California, United States.

She was elected as the city's mayor in 1999 and was re-elected once until losing to Ernest Gutierrez in the 2003 election. When elected mayor, Montes became the city's first Hispanic mayor in 89 years.

References

Living people
Mayors of places in California
Women mayors of places in California
People from El Monte, California
Year of birth missing (living people)
21st-century American women